"Say Goodbye" is the debut single from Australian band Indecent Obsession. The song was included on their debut album Spoken Words (1989). The song peaked at number 6 on the Australian ARIA Chart.

Track listing
 7" single (LS 2064)
 "Say Goodbye" (4:07)
 "Take it Higher" (3:29)

 12" single
 "Say Goodbye" (Got It Mix)  ( 4:44)
 "Say Goodbye"  (Girth Mix)  ( 7:05)
 "Say Goodbye"  (Extended Version)  (6:48)

Chart performance

Weekly charts

Year-end charts

References

External links
 "Say Goodbye" by Indecent Obsession

1989 debut singles
1989 songs
Indecent Obsession songs